Franz Podezin (1911–1995) was a German SS-Hauptscharführer and Gestapo chief in Rechnitz, Austria. On the night of 24–25 March 1945, allegedly on the direction of the "Killer Countess", Margaret of Batthyany daughter of Baron Heinrich Thyssen, Podezin engaged in the massacre of at least 180 Hungarian Jewish slave laborers in Rechnitz who were assigned to dig anti-tank ditches in anticipation of the approaching Red Army.

The slave laborers were machine gunned to death allegedly as part of a perverse celebration of Nazi functionaries at Batthyany's Schloss Rechnitz. There has been controversy over the version of events as reported by British journalist David Litchfield. The fact that the killings occurred and Podezin took part is not disputed. The dispute stems from whether the killings were done to amuse the guests at the party and if party guests took part in the murders.

References

External links
Simon Wiesenthal Center:Operation Last Chance 

Das Magazin:The Terrible Secret The Batthyany Conspiracy: All Innocent On The Eastern Front  Article by Sacha Batthyany in ‘Das Magazin’, Switzerland, 11.12.2009. Translation copyright Caroline Schmitz.
Austrian Research Center for Postwar trials: (Nachkrieg Justiz) Use of Hungarian-Jewish forced laborers at the "Südostwall"

1911 births
1995 deaths
Gestapo personnel
Holocaust perpetrators in Austria
SS non-commissioned officers